Vladimir Petrovich Kononov (born October 14, 1974; nom de guerre Tsar) is a former defence minister of the self-proclaimed Donetsk People's Republic, serving from August 15, 2014 after the resignation of Igor Girkin (also known as Igor Strelkov) until October 1, 2018.

Kononov is a Donetsk local. In 2014, he was a lieutenant colonel, and by 2015 was promoted to major general.

Biography 
Vladimir Petrovich Kononov was born in 1974 in the city of Gorskoe of the Lugansk region.  He graduated from Sloviansk and the aviation college of civil aviation in 1995, and from the Slavic State Pedagogical Institute in 1999.

He was professionally engaged in sports and pedagogical activities, and worked as a coach in the Judo Federation of Donetsk region. He has 20 years of coaching experience in judo. He also passed special training for senior commanders.

On April 13, 2014 he volunteered in the people's militia of Donbass, and led the checkpoint in Sloviansk.  He commanded the unit in confrontation in battles in Sloviansk, Shakhtorsk, Ilovaysk, Mospino and other settlements. His military rank (as of August 2014) was lieutenant colonel.

After the resignation of Igor Strelkov, he became acting defense minister of the People's Republic of Donetsk.  He became defense minister of the Donetsk People's Republic on August 14, 2014. On October 1 2018, the Donetsk People's Republic allegedly abolished the office of defence minister.

He is married and has a child. His younger brother is one of the commanders of the militia of the NDP.

References 

1974 births
Living people
People from Hirske
People of the Donetsk People's Republic
Pro-Russian people of the 2014 pro-Russian unrest in Ukraine
Pro-Russian people of the war in Donbas
Ukrainian collaborators with Russia